The Ridgefield School District is a public school district serving students in pre-kindergarten through twelfth grade in Ridgefield, Connecticut, United States.

As of the 2017-18 school year, the district, comprising nine schools, had an enrollment of 4,908 students and 398.3 classroom teachers (on an FTE basis), for a student–teacher ratio of 12.3:1.

Schools
Schools in the district are:
Elementary schools
Barlow Mountain Elementary School (329 students; in grades PreK-5)
Branchville Elementary School (360; PreK-5)
Farmingville Elementary School (329; K-5)
Ridgebury Elementary School (338; PreK-5)
Scotland Elementary School (374; PreK-5)
Veterans Park Elementary School (282; PreK-5)
Middle schools

East Ridge Middle School (500; 6-8)
Scotts Ridge Middle School (697; 6-8)
High schools
Ridgefield High School (1,658; 9-12)

External links
 Ridgefield Public Schools Website

References

Education in Fairfield County, Connecticut
School districts in Connecticut
Ridgefield, Connecticut